In Dianetics and Scientology, auditing is a process whereby the "auditor" takes an individual through times in their current or past lives with the purpose of ridding the individual of negative influences from past events or behaviors. According to practitioners, auditing is meant to bring the individual to "Clear" status; thus, an individual being audited is known as a "preclear" or PC.

Auditing was invented by L. Ron Hubbard as an integral part of Dianetics, first introduced in 1950. In 1951, auditing also became a core practice of Scientology. The E-meter, a device to measure electrodermal activity, became an integral part of auditing in scientology. According to the Church of Scientology, "one formal definition of auditing is the action of asking a person a question (which he can understand and answer), getting an answer to that question and acknowledging him or her for that answer".

Hubbard claimed auditing provided many benefits including unsupported medical and psychological health effects. Since 1971, Scientology now publishes disclaimers in its books and publications declaring that the E-Meter "by itself does nothing", and that it is used specifically for spiritual purposes, not for mental or physical health.

Description
In the context of Dianetics or Scientology auditing, Dianetics addresses the body, Scientology the spirit or being. Auditing is an activity where an auditor, trained in the task of communication, listens and gives auditing commands to a subject, who is referred to as a "preclear", or more often as a "PC". Auditing sessions are confidential.

Auditing involves the use of "processes", which are sets of questions asked or directions given by an auditor. Based on a prior interview looking for "charged" subjects—"charge" being that which prevents the PC from thinking on a subject or getting rid of a subject or approaching a subject—on the E-meter, found by asking questions to the PC in regard to them and their fancied case. When the specific objective of any one process is achieved, the process is ended, and another can then be started. Through auditing, the subjects are said to free themselves from barriers that inhibit their natural abilities. Charged areas can be viewed as areas of misinformation or lies. Once uncovered, they dissipate as their truth becomes apparent and the charge is eliminated once viewed for what it really is, an untruth.

The auditor is obliged to maintain a strict code of conduct, called the Auditor's Code. Auditing is said to be successful only when the auditor conducts himself in accordance with the Code. A violation of the Auditor's Code is considered a high crime in Scientology.

The code outlines a series of 29 promises, which include pledges such as:
 Not to evaluate for the preclear or tell him what he should think about his case in session
 Not to invalidate the preclear's case or gains in or out of session
 Never to use the secrets of a preclear divulged in session for punishment or personal gain

The main intention of an auditing session is to remove "charged incidents" that have caused trauma, which are believed in Scientology to be stored in the "reactive mind". These incidents must then be eliminated for proper functioning.

In 1952, auditing techniques "began to focus on the goal of exteriorizing the thetan" with the goal of providing complete spiritual awareness.

E-meter

Most auditing sessions employ a device called the Hubbard Electropsychometer or E-Meter. The E-Meter is not a custom electrodermal activity measurement device, instead it measures the resistance of the body (flesh, bones, liquids and all; skin resistance is only a small part of the total resistance being measured) from one hand through the breast to the other hand. It measures changes in the electrical resistance of the "preclear" by passing a small electric current (typically in the range from 50 µA to 120 µA) through the preclear's body by means of a pair of tin-plated tubes originally much like empty soup cans, attached to the meter by wires and held by the preclear during auditing. These changes in electrical resistance are allegedly a reliable and precise indication of changes in the "reactive mind" of the preclear.

According to L. Ron Hubbard the development of the E-Meter enabled auditing techniques and made it more precise. Later, the E-Meter was used to identify which processes should (and could) be run and equally crucially, to determine when to stop running a particular action. As a repair tool, the E-Meter reacts to a list of possible difficulties and relevant phrases, called out by the auditor, helping to guide the auditor to the difficulty. Hubbard clarified how the E-Meter should be used in conjunction with auditing:

Hubbard claimed that the device also has such sensitivity that it can measure whether or not fruits can experience pain, claiming in 1968 that tomatoes "scream when sliced".

Scientology teaches that individuals are immortal souls or spirits (called thetans by Scientology) and are not limited to a single lifetime. Scientologists state that the E-Meter aids the auditor in locating subliminal memories ("engrams", "incidents", and "implants") of past events in a thetan's current life and in previous ones. In such Scientology publications as Have You Lived Before This Life, Hubbard wrote about past life experiences dating back billions and even trillions of years.

When various foundations of Dianetics were formed in the 1950s, auditing sessions were a hybrid of confession, counseling and psychotherapy. According to Passas and Castillo, the E-Meter was used to "disclose truth to the individual who is being processed and thus free him spiritually".

The Bridge 

At the very end of his 1950 book Dianetics: the Modern Science of Mental Health, Hubbard talks about a bridge from one plateau of existence to another, higher plateau.

Hubbard wanted to make the processes structured in such a way that one could take a new person and walk them through standardized steps, one after another, to cross this hypothesized "Bridge". This intent led to the development of the Standard Operating Procedure for Theta Clearing by 1952.

In 1970, the Standard Operating Procedure was used to create the Classification and Gradation Chart. This chart, first published in 1965 and revised in 1966, 1968 and 1969, had the steps of the bridge plotted out from a beginner at the bottom to the highest states attainable at the top.  The left-hand side of the chart contains auditor skill levels, while the right-hand side contains preclear grades and OT (Operating Thetan) levels.

The 1970 version of the chart is entitled "Classification Gradation and Awareness Chart of Levels and Certificates". By 1974 the above title had slipped down a little to make way for "THE BRIDGE" as the top line, with "TO A NEW WORLD" underneath in a smaller font. A more recent chart is entitled "THE BRIDGE TO TOTAL FREEDOM" and subtitled "SCIENTOLOGY CLASSIFICATION GRADATION AND AWARENESS CHART."

Procedure 
Each Grade on the Bridge has a list of processes that auditors should run. Some auditing actions use commands, for example "Recall a time you knew you understood someone," and some auditing actions use questions such as, "What are you willing for me to talk to others about?" Below are sample commands from processes run in each Grade.

ARC Straightwire: "Recall a communication."  
Grade 0: "Recall a place from which you have communicated to another." 
Grade I: "Recall a problem you have had with another." 
Grade II: "Recall a secret." 
Grade III: "Can you recall a time of change?" 
Grade IV: "What about a victim you could be responsible for?"

Each Grade is targeted at a specific area of potential difficulty a person might have. The working hypothesis is that if the subject matter is not "charged"; in other words, if it is not causing any difficulty, then it will not read on the E-meter, and therefore will not be run. (Reference see above)

A possible audit could be performed like this:

Auditor:  "Recall a secret."
Preclear:	"I deliberately broke the window in the hall with my ball."
Auditor: "Thank you. Recall a secret."
Preclear:	"I saw my sister kissing the postman."
Auditor: "Ok. Recall a secret."
Preclear:	"I hate my mum's apple pie, but my dad told me not to tell her."
Auditor: "Thank you. Recall a secret."

Controversy

Preclear folders

The Scientology and Dianetics auditing process has raised concerns from a number of quarters, as auditing sessions are permanently recorded in the form of handwritten notes in preclear folders, which are supposed to be kept private. Judge Paul Breckenridge, in Church of Scientology of California v. Armstrong, noted that Mary Sue Hubbard (the plaintiff in that case) "authored the infamous order 'GO 121669', which directed culling of supposedly confidential P.C. Preclear files/folders for the purposes of internal security". This directive was later canceled because it was not part of Scientology as written by L. Ron Hubbard. Bruce Hines has noted in an interview with Hoda Kotb that Scientology's collecting of personal and private information through auditing can possibly leave an adherent vulnerable to potential "blackmail" should they ever consider disaffecting from the cult. A number of sources have claimed that preclear folders have indeed been used for intimidation and harassment.

Anderson Report

In 1965 the Anderson Report, an official inquiry conducted for the state of Victoria, Australia, found that auditing involved a form of  "authoritative" or "command" hypnosis, in which the hypnotist assumes "positive authoritative control" over the subject.  "It is the firm conclusion of this Board that most scientology and dianetic techniques are those of authoritative hypnosis and as such are dangerous. ... the scientific evidence which the Board heard from several expert witnesses of the highest repute ... which was virtually unchallenged - leads to the inescapable conclusion that it is only in name that there is any difference between authoritative hypnosis and most of the techniques of scientology. "

Claims
L. Ron Hubbard claimed benefits from auditing including improved IQ, improved ability to communicate, enhanced memory and alleviation of issues such as psychosis, dyslexia and attention deficit disorder. Some people have alleged that auditing amounts to medical treatment without a license, and in the 1950s, some auditors were arrested on the charge. The Church disputes that it is practicing medicine, and it has successfully established in United States courts of law that auditing addresses only spiritual relief. According to the Church, the psychotherapist treats mental health and the Church treats the spiritual being. Hubbard clarified the difference between the two:

In 1971, a ruling of the United States District Court, District of Columbia (333 F. Supp. 357), specifically stated that the E-meter "has no proven usefulness in the diagnosis, treatment or prevention of any disease, nor is it medically or scientifically capable of improving any bodily function." As a result of this ruling, Scientology now publishes disclaimers in its books and publications declaring that the E-meter "by itself does nothing" and that it is used specifically for spiritual purposes.

Child auditors
Dutch investigative reporter Rinke Verkerk reported that she was given an auditing session by an 11-year-old in the Netherlands. This has been criticized by clinical psychologists and child psychologists, on the grounds that secondary stress can affect children more strongly than adults. The fact that the child was working full days for a whole weekend was also considered to be problematic.

An auditor is only allowed to audit processes (on others) which are below his own case (level of auditing which he has undergone).

References

External links
Secrets of Scientology: The E-Meter

Auditing